Stephen Titus Hosmer (January 10, 1763 – August 5, 1834) was an American lawyer and jurist who was the chief justice of the Connecticut Supreme Court from 1815 to 1833.

Biography
He was born in Middletown, Connecticut and lived there all his life. He was the son of Titus Hosmer, a member of the Continental Congress. He attended Yale University, graduating in 1782, and began his law practice in 1785. He was a member of the Connecticut Council for ten years.

Hosmer married Lucia Parsons, a daughter of General Samuel Holden Parsons; they had 11 children, of which only 3 were alive in 1834 when Hosmer died (and his daughter Sarah Mehetable died of cholera eight days after her father.)

References

1763 births
1834 deaths
Politicians from Middletown, Connecticut
Connecticut state court judges
Chief Justices of the Connecticut Supreme Court
Connecticut state senators
Members of the Connecticut General Assembly Council of Assistants (1662–1818)
Yale University alumni